A list of the Lord Lieutenants of Fermanagh, located County Fermanagh of Northern Ireland, U.K.

The Lord Lieutenant is a ceremonial local government position. There were lieutenants of counties in Ireland until the reign of James II, when they were renamed governors. The office of Lord Lieutenant was recreated on 23 August 1831.

Governors
 Sir John Hume, 2nd Baronet: c.1662– (died 1695)
 Roger Maguire: 1689–1691 (Jacobite)
 James Corry: 1705–  (died 1718)
 Henry Brooke: 1709–  (died 1761)
 Mervyn Archdall: 1756 –1772 
 William Cole, 1st Earl of Enniskillen: –1803 (Governor of Enniskillen) (died 1803)
 Nicholas Hume-Loftus, 2nd Earl of Ely: 1767–1769
 John Creighton, 1st Earl Erne: 1772–1828 
 Charles Loftus, 1st Marquess of Ely: –1806 (died 1806)
 Sir John Caldwell, 5th Baronet: 1793– (died 1830)
 Mervyn Archdall: 1813–1831
 John Cole, 2nd Earl of Enniskillen: –1831
 John Loftus, 2nd Marquess of Ely: –1831
 The Hon. John Creighton: 1830–1831

Lord Lieutenants
The 2nd Earl of Enniskillen: 17 October 1831 – 31 March 1840
The 3rd Earl Erne: April 1840 – 3 October 1885
The 4th Earl Erne: 1885 – 2 December 1914
John Ernest Francis Collum: 31 March 1915 – 1948
The 5th Earl of Enniskillen: 25 September 1948 – 19 February 1963
The 1st Viscount Brookeborough: 26 April 1963 – February 1969
vacant
Major-General Thomas Scott: 17 June 1971 – 30 July 1976
The 5th Duke of Westminster: 7 February 1977 – 19 February 1979
Viola, Dowager Duchess of Westminster: 20 August 1979 – 1986
The 6th Earl Erne, KCVO: 20 August 1986 – July 2012
The 3rd Viscount Brookeborough: 2 July 2012 – present

Deputy lieutenant of Fermanagh
A deputy lieutenant of Fermanagh is commissioned by the Lord Lieutenant of Fermanagh. Deputy lieutenants support the work of the lord-lieutenant. There can be several deputy lieutenants at any time, depending on the population of the county. Their appointment does not terminate with the changing of the lord-lieutenant, but they usually retire at age 75.

21st Century
5 May 2000: Mary Blake
5 May 2000: Melanie Little
5 May 2000: Jane Styles
5 May 2000: Rosemary Wilkinson

See also
List of lord lieutenants in the United Kingdom

References

External links

 
History of County Fermanagh
People from County Fermanagh
Politics of County Fermanagh
Fermanagh